The 2016 Savannah Challenger was a professional tennis tournament played on clay courts. It was the seventh edition of the tournament which was part of the 2016 ATP Challenger Tour. It took place in Savannah, Georgia, United States between 18 and 24 April 2015.

Singles main-draw entrants

Seeds

Other entrants
The following players received wildcards into the singles main draw:
  Denis Kudla
  Brian Baker
  Tommy Paul
  Tennys Sandgren

The following players received entry from the qualifying draw:
  Peter Polansky
  Nicolás Jarry
  Tomás Lipovšek Puches
  Roman Safiullin

The following players entered as a lucky loser:
  Robin Staněk

Champions

Singles

 Bjorn Fratangelo def.  Jared Donaldson, 6–1, 6–3

Doubles

 Brian Baker /  Ryan Harrison def.  Purav Raja /  Divij Sharan, 5–7, 7–6(7–4), [10–8]

External links
Official Website

Savannah Challenger
Savannah Challenger
Tennis tournaments in Georgia (U.S. state)